Haden House is a historic house located in Ladonia, Texas. The house was built in 1894 for J. B. Haden. In 1963, the Haden family sold the home. The home is well-preserved, retaining its detailed woodwork, stained-glass windows, and many of its original furnishings.

References 

National Register of Historic Places in Fannin County, Texas
Recorded Texas Historic Landmarks